Men and Women is an American play written by David Belasco and Henry Churchill de Mille.

It was featured on Broadway in 1890, opening at Proctor's Twenty-Third Street Theater on October 21, 1890.  The cast included Maude Adams.  It proved successful with audiences, and played for over 200 performances.

It was adapted to a silent film of the same name in 1914.

References

External links

American plays
1890 plays